Paul Bernard Mullin (born 16 March 1974) is an English former professional footballer. He is the brother of fellow former footballer John Mullin.

Career
Born in Burnley to Bernard and Mary Mullin, Mullin started his career with Accrington in 1995, making his first-team debut before being released. He then played for Darwen, Trafford, and spent two-and-a-half years at Clitheroe before joining Radcliffe Borough in the summer of 1998. Two years later, in August 2000, he rejoined Stanley, newly promoted to the Northern Premier League Premier Division as champions, for a fee of £15,000, after a bid of £10,000 had been rejected the previous season. He turned professional in July 2004, when Stanley went full-time after their first season in the Conference, during which Mullin scored 24 goals in all competitions and won the club's player of the year award.

On 14 April 2007, Mullin broke Chris Grimshaw's record for club appearances for Accrington Stanley with 362 games, in a 4–1 victory against Grimsby Town. He scored the first of Stanley's four goals during the match. Mullin rejected the offer to be captain for the day to avoid getting himself into a testimonial mentality.

In March 2009, Mullin joined fellow League Two side Bradford City on loan for the rest of the 2008–09 season, to replace Barry Conlon, who was loaned to Grimsby Town. Bradford lost 1–0 to Port Vale on Mullin's debut the following day.

On 31 August 2009 Mullin signed for Morecambe on a one-year deal with option of further year, for an undisclosed fee. He scored his first goal for Morecambe in a 2–1 win over Notts County. On 15 April 2011 Mullin announced his retirement from football.

Honours
Northern Premier League (VI): 2003
Conference National (V): 2006

References

External links

1974 births
Living people
Footballers from Burnley
English footballers
Association football forwards
Accrington Stanley F.C. players
Darwen F.C. players
Trafford F.C. players
Clitheroe F.C. players
Radcliffe F.C. players
Bradford City A.F.C. players
Morecambe F.C. players
Northern Premier League players
National League (English football) players
English Football League players